A Procrustes transformation is a geometric transformation that involves only translation, rotation, uniform scaling, or a combination of these transformations. Hence, it may change the size or position, but not the shape of a geometric object.

Named after the mythical Greek robber, Procrustes, who made his victims fit his bed either by stretching their limbs or cutting them off.

See also
 Procrustes analysis
 Orthogonal Procrustes problem
 Singular value decomposition
 Affine transformation, which also allows for shear

External links
 Procrustes transformation

Euclidean symmetries